Morgan–McClure Motorsports was an American auto racing team that competed in the NASCAR Cup Series full-time until 2007. It operated for 28 years, starting in 1983 and ending in 2012. The team was most notable for running the No. 4 from 1983 to 2010.

History

Starting out

Morgan–McClure Motorsports was owned by business partners Larry McClure and Tim Morgan. It began in 1983 when the two purchased a race car from G. C. Spencer. The car debuted at Talladega Superspeedway and was piloted by Connie Saylor. The car finished 40th after suffering engine failure. After firing Connie because they wanted a younger driver and after obtaining the rights to No. 4 & the car he drove for G. C. Spencer, Mark Martin took over the driving duties later that year, and had one top-10 finish. In 1984, the team signed Folgers as a sponsor and began racing as car No. 4. Tommy Ellis ran twenty races that year for the team, with Lennie Pond and Joe Ruttman running the rest of the schedule. Ruttman drove sixteen races for them next season, notching one top-5 and four top-10 finishes. In 1986, MMM got Eastman Kodak sponsorship and signed Rick Wilson to handle the driving chores. Wilson got the team its first pole position at Bristol Motor Speedway in 1988, its first full season on the circuit. When Wilson announced he was leaving the team in 1989, the team was eighth in points.

The prime years

For the 1990 season, the team hired Phil Parsons, but after three races, Parsons was released in favor of Ernie Irvan. In his first race with the team, Irvan started 30th, and finished third. Two races later, Irvan won his first pole position at Bristol Motor Speedway. The team switched from Oldsmobile to Chevrolet in order to get more manufacturer support. Their first race after the switch was at the 1990 Bud at the Glen. Irvan picked up his first career victory, as well as the first victory for MMM the following week at Bristol, in the Busch 500. The next season, Irvan won the Daytona 500 and The Bud at the Glen (The latter was marred by the death of popular veteran J. D. McDuffie). When the checkered flag fell at the end of the season, the team was fifth in points. The next season, Irvan won three races over a two-month stretch, at Sears Point International Raceway, the Pepsi 400 at the Daytona International Speedway, and at Talladega Superspeedway, respectively. In 1993, Irvan won the pole twice, as well as a victory at Talladega. When Davey Allison died in an aircraft accident, Robert Yates asked Irvan to take his place. Irvan wanted out of his contract with MMM, and it ensued into an ugly lawsuit. Irvan was able to get out, but there were hurt feelings on both sides.

For the 1994 season, the team hired Sterling Marlin to drive. In his first race in the team, Marlin won the Daytona 500, beating out, ironically, Irvan. Marlin won the 500 the next year as well, in addition to two more races at Darlington Speedway and Talladega. In 1996, Marlin won two races, at Talladega and the Pepsi 400 at Daytona.

Struggles

After the team went winless with Marlin in 1997, finishing 25th in points, the team and Marlin decided to part ways. MMM hired two-time race winner Bobby Hamilton. Hamilton led 378 out of 500 laps and won from the pole at Martinsville Speedway and finished 10th in the final points standings. Soon, the team was not able repeat its success, and Hamilton left for Andy Petree Racing in 2001. He was replaced by Robby Gordon, but Gordon struggled in the ride and was released after just five races. Mike Skinner and Kevin Lepage shared the driving duties for two years without much success. In 2003, MMM switched to Pontiac. They lost their Kodak sponsorship in 2004, but MMM remained open, switching back to Chevrolet (almost being required to do so, as Pontiac had withdrawn from the Cup series at the end of 2003). Jimmy Spencer drove the car most of that year, and team co-owner Larry McClure's son Eric drove another team car to finish 26th at Talladega Superspeedway. For 2005, the team signed Lucas Oil as a sponsor, and hired Mike Wallace to drive. Wallace was replaced by John Andretti, P. J. Jones, and Todd Bodine for some of the races in 2005. In 2006, Scott Wimmer was announced as the 2006 driver with new sponsorship from the Utah-based AERO Exhaust. Wimmer had an average start of 35th and average of finish 29th, no wins, top fives, or top tens. On October 3, 2006, Larry McClure announced that the team and Wimmer parted ways. They hired Todd Bodine to drive the next two races, Charlotte and Atlanta, until they could find a permanent replacement. The last three races the team hired veteran Ward Burton, who at the time had not driven in the Cup Series in several years. On December 12, 2006, MMM announced they signed Burton to take full-time seat in 2007 with sponsorship from State Water Heaters. Burton was released before the last race of the 2007 season. Furthermore, Morgan–McClure Motorsports shut down weeks shy of the 2008 Daytona 500 due to financial problems, but had agreed to let Mike Wallace drive in the 2008 Daytona 500 if sponsorship was found.  Sponsorship was found, but Larry McClure said that he was tired of just sliding by and would come back when major sponsorship could be secured. When Tony Stewart announced on August 14 that Ryan Newman would drive the No. 4 car in 2009, Morgan–McClure Motorsports protested. Tim Morgan stated, "There's some sweat and history in that number 4. We feel like it ours," in an article for the Bristol Herald Courier.  After discussions with MMM and NASCAR, on August 18 Stewart announced that Newman would drive the No. 39 instead of a No. 4 car in 2009. In 2014 Stewart did acquire the No. 4 to use with driver Kevin Harvick, who replaced Newman and the No. 39 in the 2014 season.

Rumors indicated that Morgan–McClure Motorsports would prepare a No. 4 Chevy to attempt the 2009 Daytona 500, but this did not happen. On April 11, 2009, the team made public their intentions to attempt the Aaron's 499 at Talladega Superspeedway with driver Eric McClure in the No. 4 Hefty/Walmart Chevy, however the team failed to qualify for the race. Scott Wimmer attempted to qualify the car at Bristol. Wimmer made the event, Morgan–McClure's first start since 2007. He finished 29th. Wimmer also attempted Dover but they were the only team to not qualify.

Since 2009, legal problems have prevented Morgan–McClure from actively competing. Larry McClure was charged with federal income tax fraud for not reporting $269,000 for cars used in the ARCA series. He was also forced to pay back $60,000 to Eastman-Kodak for falsifying an invoice. McClure spent eighteen months in jail and works at a family car dealership.

MMM returned to the Cup Series at Bristol in August 2010, but Kevin Lepage failed to qualify for the race. The team never attempted another race again, with their No. 4 being used by Red Bull Racing Team for Kasey Kahne in 2011 without any objections from Morgan-McClure. The team closed its doors in 2012.

Driver history
Connie Saylor (1983)
Mark Martin (1983)
Lennie Pond (1984)
Tommy Ellis (1984)
Joe Ruttman (1984–85)
Rick Wilson (1986–89)
Lake Speed (1986)
A. J. Foyt (1987)
Phil Parsons (1990)
Ernie Irvan (1990–93)
Jeff Purvis (1993)
Joe Nemechek (1993)
Jimmy Hensley (1993)
Sterling Marlin (1994–97)
Bobby Hamilton (1998–2000)
Robby Gordon (2001)
Kevin Lepage (2001, 2003–2004, 2010 Bristol August, but DNQ)
Bobby Hamilton Jr. (2001)
Mike Skinner (2002–03)
Johnny Miller (2003; road races only)
Stacy Compton (2003)
Johnny Sauter (2003)
Brett Bodine (2003; DNQ at Pocono & Indianapolis)
P. J. Jones (2003 Watkins Glen; 2005 road races; 2006 Sonoma)
Jimmy Spencer (2004)
Eric McClure (2004, 2006, 2009 Talladega April, but DNQ)
Mike Wallace (2004–05)
John Andretti (2005 Michigan in August)
Todd Bodine (2005–07)
Scott Wimmer (2006; 2009 Bristol August; Dover September; but DNQ)
Ward Burton (2006–07)

Motorsports career results

NASCAR Cup Series
(key) (Bold – Pole position awarded by qualifying time. Italics – Pole position earned by points standings or practice time. * – Most laps led.)

Car No. 4 results

Car No. 04 results

Footnotes

References

External links

American auto racing teams
Companies based in Virginia
Auto racing teams established in 1983
Auto racing teams disestablished in 2012
Defunct NASCAR teams
ARCA Menards Series teams
Re-established companies